James Bayley (dates unknown) was an English professional cricketer who made four known appearances in first-class cricket matches from 1773 to 1783.

Career
He was associated with Hampshire.

References

External sources
 CricketArchive record

English cricketers
English cricketers of 1701 to 1786
Hampshire cricketers
Hambledon cricketers
Year of birth unknown
Year of death unknown